Lin Chia-ying (born 11 May 1982 in Taichung City) is a Taiwanese shot putter.

Biography
She finished ninth at the 2005 Summer Universiade, eighth at the 2005 Asian Championships and won the bronze medal at the 2006 Asian Games. She also competed at the 2007 World Championships, the 2008 World Indoor Championships, 2008 Olympic Games, the 2012 Olympic Games and the 2014 World Indoor Championships without reaching the final round.

Her personal best throw is 17.48 metres, set at the 2014 Asian Games.

She started to work in National Taiwan Sport University as a throwing coach from 2011 but still acts as an active athlete for TPE team.

Competition record

References

1982 births
Living people
Asian Games medalists in athletics (track and field)
Athletes (track and field) at the 2008 Summer Olympics
Athletes (track and field) at the 2012 Summer Olympics
Olympic athletes of Taiwan
Sportspeople from Taichung
Taiwanese female shot putters
Athletes (track and field) at the 2006 Asian Games
Athletes (track and field) at the 2010 Asian Games
Athletes (track and field) at the 2014 Asian Games
Athletes (track and field) at the 2018 Asian Games
Asian Games bronze medalists for Chinese Taipei
Medalists at the 2006 Asian Games